Legal.io is a technology company for legal organizations and legal networks to match clients to lawyers, legal knowledge, and services. Their aim is to offer legal professionals a better way to practice, innovate, and scale the provision of affordable legal services.

LawGives was launched in 2012, in conjunction with Mozilla, as an online Q and A forum for legal questions. Since 2015, the technology platform powering LawGives has been offered as legal infrastructure for legal referral networks nationwide, including bar associations and networks organized as legal incubators, under the company name "Legal.io."

History

Legal.io (formerly LawGives) was founded in Stanford, California in 2011 by Stanford Law School LLM candidates Tony Lai and Pieter Gunst, former lawyers for Herbert Smith and DLA Piper respectively. The two had the idea while working on an LLM project during their time at Stanford Law School.

Legal.io / LawGives has been touted as one of the best emerging companies in the legal technology space. In 2015, co-founder Pieter Gunst was named as one of Forbes 30 under 30 in Law & Policy, and they were recognized as the Best New California Legal Service of 2015 by The Recorder.

Current Customers 
Legal.io currently works with the following customers:
 The New York State Bar Association 
 Twitch - California Lawyers for the Arts 
 The Iowa State Bar Association 
 The Nebraska State Bar Association 
 The LGBT Bar Association of Greater New York

Access to Justice

The company's focus on the access to justice mission falls in line with similar concerns from other organizations. In 2014, the Benjamin N. Cardozo School of Law published a study exposing that some states have fewer than 1 civil legal aid lawyer per 10,000 residents who rank as poor under federal standards, nearly one quarter of states have no rule to allow court clerks to help people without legal help, and nearly half of state judicial web sites have no information in languages other than English.

Lisa Kaufman, of the Columbia Law School's Human Rights Clinic has stated:

"In the United States, millions of people are forced to go it alone when they're facing a crisis," Kaufman says. "It's a human rights crisis, and the United States is really losing ground with the rest of the world."

References

Law firms established in 2011
Internet properties established in 2011
Online marketplaces of the United States
American legal websites